Slidell station is an Amtrak intercity train station in Slidell, Louisiana, served by the daily  train. It was built in 1913 for the use of the New Orleans and Northeastern and the New Orleans Great Northern Railroads. Slidell was first established in 1881 as a construction camp for the NO&NE. The station is served by one daily Amtrak train.

The Norfolk Southern Railway, successor to the NO&NE, donated the depot to the city in 1996.  It was substantially renovated with a grant from the Louisiana Department of Transportation and Development with funds received from the federal government under the Intermodal Surface Transportation Efficiency Act of 1991. It currently houses an art gallery, the Slidell Cultural Center, and an American-style hamburger restaurant named Times Grill.

It was added to the National Register of Historic Places in 1996 as New Orleans and Northeastern–New Orleans and Great Northern Railroad Depot.

References

External links 

Slidell Amtrak Station (USA Rail Guide -- Train Web)

Buildings and structures in St. Tammany Parish, Louisiana
Slidell
Slidell
Stations along Southern Railway lines in the United States
Transportation in St. Tammany Parish, Louisiana
Slidell, Louisiana
National Register of Historic Places in St. Tammany Parish, Louisiana
Railway stations in the United States opened in 1913
1913 establishments in Louisiana